Mixed doubles at the 2006 Asian Games was won by Sania Mirza and Leander Paes of India.

Schedule
All times are Arabia Standard Time (UTC+03:00)

Results

Final

Top half

Bottom half

References
Mixed doubles draw

Mixed doubles